The Alliance of Concerned Teachers (ACT-Teachers) is a progressive and militant national democratic mass organization of teachers, academics, and other education workers in the Philippines, established on June 26, 1982. It is the largest non-traditional teachers' organization in the country, and campaigns for the economic and political rights of teachers and other education workers as well as on wider social and political issues.

History 
In 1989, ACT succeeded in its campaign for higher wages of $32 a month as well as improved benefits for teachers. This was achieved after public school teachers went on strike from July 24 to August 12.

On September 30, 2005, national council member of the ACT Vitoria Samonte was murdered, an act which was called a human rights violation.

Another national council member, Napoleon Pornasdoro, was murdered on February 27, 2006. They were also general secretary of the Southern Tagalog Teachers for Development.

Objectives
ACT's stated objectives are:

 To unite teachers and other education workers to struggle for their democratic rights and economic welfare.
 To advance a nationalist, scientific and mass-oriented education.
 To encourage active and dynamic participation of teachers and other education workers in social transformation.
 To represent, assist and defend its affiliates and their individual members, in particular, and the teachers and other education workers, in general, in the advancement of their legitimate rights and interests.
 To launch campaigns to protect human rights, the environment and the national minorities/indigenous peoples, promote gender equality, genuine land reform, workers’ rights, and be involved with other social issues.
 To help in the formation of the broadest unity of all oppressed sectors of Philippine society in advancing the interests of the Filipino people.
 To unite with progressive individuals, groups and movements abroad who share common beliefs and aspirations with ACT-Philippines.

Membership requirements
Membership of ACT is open to national and regional organizations whose membership or composition include federations, unions, alliances, cooperatives, political, disciplinal or interest associations of teachers and education workers. Active and nationalist teaching and non-teaching personnel working in the education sector at any level (pre-school, elementary, secondary or tertiary) in both public and private institutions who are members of an education-based organization are eligible.

ACT is the umbrella group of two national organizations: the Congress of Teachers for Nationalism and Democracy (CONTEND), a militant and nationalist teachers' organization, and the National Federation of Teachers and Employees' Union (NAFTEU), the national organization of school-based labor unions.  Membership in these organizations means automatic affiliation with ACT.

Individual members who are eligible are also accepted.

Organization
ACT's main organizing and consolidation activities are integration and education. Representatives of the organization make regular visits to update members on the organization's activities and campaigns. Discussions, dialogues, fora, and symposia are held related to current issues that directly or indirectly affect the education sector. ACT also promotes the principles and objectives of the organization among the population and campaigns against foreign influence on the Philippine educational system and wider society. ACT also provides institutional services like free legal aid, media representation, training, and other forms of assistance. It publishes a quarterly publication, the ACT Forum, for its membership.

Electoral performance

Representatives to Congress
15th Congress (2010–13) – Antonio Tinio
16th Congress (2013–16) – Antonio Tinio
17th Congress (2016–19) – Antonio Tinio, Frances Castro
18th Congress (2019–22) – Frances Castro
19th Congress (2022–present) – Frances Castro

References

External links 

 Official website  , Library of Congress Archive

Party-lists represented in the House of Representatives of the Philippines
Organizations established in 1982
Political parties established in 2010
Left-wing parties in the Philippines
1982 establishments in the Philippines
National Democracy Movement (Philippines)
Socialist parties in the Philippines